The Eanna-shum-iddina kudurru  is a boundary stone of governor Eanna-shum-iddina in the Sealand Dynasty of Babylon in the mid 2nd millennium BC. Sealand was the region of southern Mesopotamia along the Persian Gulf.

NB: The British Museum dates this kudurru to 1125-1100 BC:

https://www.britishmuseum.org/explore/highlights/highlight_objects/me/b/boundary_stone_kudurru-6.aspx

The "Eanna-shum-iddina kudurru" was a land grant to a person named Gula-eresh, witnessed by his surveyor Amurru-bel-zeri. The iconography of the stone includes cuneiform text, two middle registers with gods, and a larger upper, scenic register of gods, with sky–glyph representations of gods.

See also

Eanna-shum-iddina
Kudurru

External links
Kudurru Image
Article of "Eanna-shum-iddina kudurru"
Kudurru Image-(Registers I, II, III); Article
Small Image, with "Analysis/History", Article

Kudurru boundary stones
Sculpture of the Ancient Near East
Middle Eastern objects in the British Museum